The Indianapolis Hebrew Congregation is a Reform Jewish synagogue in Indianapolis, Indiana.  It is the oldest synagogue in Indianapolis.

History

The congregation was founded in 1856 and erected its first synagogue building in 1858 "in Judah’s Block (East Washington Street), opposite the Court House."  This early building was replaced with the Market Street Temple in 1868 and the Tenth Street Temple in 1899.  The Tenth Street Temple, by the architecture firm of Vonnegut & Bohn, was a domed building in an eclectic Neoclassical style.  Rabbi Isaac Meyer Wise led the congregation at that time.  The  congregation's current building at 6501 North Meridian Street was completed in 1958.

Rabbi Maurice Davis was known for his work in the Civil Rights Movement.

Rabbi Murray Saltzman (1967 to 1978) was also known for his work in the Civil Rights Movement.

Rabbi Jonathan Stein, who was Senior Rabbi at the synagogue, is now Senior Rabbi at Temple Shaaray Tefila on New York City's Upper East Side.

Rabbi Brett Krichiver is the current Senior Rabbi.

Notable members

 Mary Fink
 Frederick Knefler
 Bill Levin, founder and the self-described Grand Poobah of the First Church of Cannabis was raised in the Congregation as a child.

References

External links
 Indianapolis Hebrew Congregation website

Reform synagogues in Indiana
Religious organizations established in 1856
Synagogues in Indiana
Religion in Indianapolis
Neoclassical synagogues
1856 establishments in Indiana